K. C.'s Blues is an album by blues musician K. C. Douglas recorded in 1961 and released on the Bluesville label.

Reception

AllMusic stated: "K.C.'s Blues consists primarily of original compositions that showcase Douglas' easy-rolling, relaxed style perfectly".

Track listing
All compositions by K. C. Douglas
 "Broken Heart" – 3:04
 "Henhouse Blues" – 4:07
 "Wake Up, Working Woman" – 2:31
 "Rootin' Ground Hog" – 3:30
 "Meanest Woman" – 3:11
 "Born in the Country" – 3:54
 "Love Me All Night Long" – 2:29
 "Tell Me" – 3:16
 "No More Cryin'" – 2:38
 "K.C.'s Doctor Blues" – 4:01
 "You Got a Good Thing Now" – 3:58
 "Watch Dog Blues" – 4:29

Personnel

Performance
K. C. Douglas – guitar, vocals

Production
 Kenneth S. Goldstein, Chris Strachwitz – producer
 Chris Strachwitz – engineer

References

K. C. Douglas albums
1961 albums
Bluesville Records albums
Blues albums by American artists